Tashi Dawa (born February 1959) or Zhaxi Dawa, is a Chinese novelist of half-Tibetan half-Han ethnic background. He is a distinguished Tibetan writer in China, and one of the most controversial figures associated with modern Tibet. He is best known for his novel The Fury Shambhala and short stories "Souls Tied to the Knots on a Leather Cord" and "On the Road to Lhasa", which were adapted into a film Soul on a String in 2017. He is a member of the China Federation of Literary and Art Circles (CFLAC). He is a guest professor at Tibet Minzu University and Tibet University. His works have been translated into English, Dutch, French, German, Italian, Japanese, Czech, Russian, and Swedish.

Biography
Tashi Dawa was born in Batang County, Sichuan, China, in February 1959. He attended the Lhasa Middle School.

In December 1974, at the end of the Cultural Revolution, he worked in Tibetan Opera Troupe.

He started to publish works in January 1979. In October 1989, he became executive vice president of Tibet Writers Association, an affiliate of China Writers Association. Three years later, he was elected vice president of the 4th Youth Federation of Tibet Autonomous Region. He rose to become president of Tibet Writers Association in August 1995.

He entered politics in December 1992, when he was appointed a Standing Committee member of the 6th Committee of the Tibet Autonomous Region of the Chinese People's Political Consultative Conference.

In November 1999 he served as vice president of Tibet Film and Television Artists Association. He became vice president of Tibet Federation of Literary and Art Circles in August 2003, a position he held for almost eight years until he was elevated to the President position. In December 2016 he was elected a member of the 9th National Committee of the China Writers Association.

Works

Novels
 The Fury Shambhala (1993)

Short stories
 "Souls Tied to the Knots on a Leather Cord"
 "On the Road to Lhasa"

Book of travels
 The Blue Buddhist Stone Pillar

Screenplay

Filmography

Film

Awards

References

External links
 Tashi Dawa Mtime 

1959 births
Living people
Chinese male novelists
Chinese male short story writers
Screenwriters from Sichuan
21st-century Chinese short story writers
20th-century Chinese short story writers
20th-century Chinese male writers
Chinese male film actors
Tibetan male actors
21st-century male writers
Politicians from Garze
People's Republic of China politicians from Sichuan
People's Republic of China short story writers
Short story writers from Sichuan
Writers from Garze